Nine Days to Christmas is a book by Marie Hall Ets and Aurora Labastida.  Released by Viking Press, it was the recipient of the Caldecott Medal for illustration in 1960.

In the story, Ceci anxiously awaits her first posada, the special Mexican Christmas party, and the opportunity to select a piñata for it.

References

American picture books
Caldecott Medal–winning works
Children's fiction books
1959 children's books
Christmas children's books
Viking Press books
Books about Mexico